Rubén Bernuncio  (born 19 January 1976 in Buenos Aires, died 18 July 1999) was an Argentine football striker who played for several clubs in Argentina, including San Lorenzo and Textil Mandiyú.  In November 1996, Bernuncio was seriously injured in a motorcycle accident and later died in 1999 from kidney failure related to the injuries he sustained.,

Club career 
He mainly played for clubs in Argentina. He also played for Busan IPark of the South Korean K League, then known as the Daewoo Royals. He was first Argentine player of K League with Hugo Smaldone

International career 
Bernuncio was part of the Argentina squad at the 1991 FIFA U-17 World Championship.

Honours

Individual
 Korean League Cup Top Assists Award: 1993

References

External links
 Argentine Primera Statistics   
 
 

1976 births
1999 deaths
Footballers from Buenos Aires
Argentine footballers
Association football forwards
San Lorenzo de Almagro footballers
Textil Mandiyú footballers
Argentinos Juniors footballers
Busan IPark players
Argentine expatriate footballers
Argentine Primera División players
K League 1 players
Road incident deaths in Argentina
Expatriate footballers in South Korea
Argentine expatriate sportspeople in South Korea
Argentina youth international footballers
Burials at La Chacarita Cemetery
Motorcycle road incident deaths
Deaths from kidney failure